Entfliehet, verschwindet, entweichet, ihr Sorgen (Fly, vanish, flee, o worries), BWV 249a, is a secular cantata by Johann Sebastian Bach. First performed in 1725, the work is also known as "Shepherd Cantata" or "Shepherds' Cantata". Bach reworked the music in his Easter Oratorio.

History 
The cantata was written in 1725 for the 43rd birthday of Christian, Duke of Saxe-Weissenfels. Bach had composed Was mir behagt, ist nur die muntre Jagd, BWV 208 for the 31st birthday of the same patron.

In 1725 Bach was working in Leipzig and the text was written by Picander, a librettist he met there. The text was published, and thus survived. The music is lost but can be reconstructed from a related work, the Easter Oratorio, which Bach also premiered in 1725. The German researcher Friedrich Smend determined that the order of movements was not changed in the Easter Oratorio, and that therefore the music of the Shepherd Cantata could be reconstructed. The missing recitatives were added by musicologist Hermann Keller. It is not known if the two instrumental movements opening the oratorio were already part of the cantata.

Scoring and structure 
The simple story shows four shepherds leaving their flock to congratulate. The shepherds are Doris (soprano), Sylvia (alto), Menalcas (tenor) and Damoetas (bass). The orchestra is festively scored for three trumpets, timpani, two oboes, bassoon, two recorders, transverse flute, two violins, viola, and basso continuo.

Sinfonia: Allegro – Adagio
Aria à duetto (tenor, bass; da capo: soprano, alto): 
Recitative (soprano, alto, tenor, bass): 
Aria (soprano): 
Recitative (soprano, alto, tenor, bass): 
Aria (tenor): 
Recitative (alto, bass): 
Aria (alto): 
Recitative (bass): 
Aria à Quartetto (soprano, alto, tenor, bass):

Music 
The tenor aria is accompanied by muted violins doubled by recorders, suggesting a lullaby as well as pastoral music.

Recording 
J.S. Bach: Schäferkantate BWV 249a · Doppelkonzert nach BWV 1060, Edith Mathis, Hetty Plümacher, Theo Altmeyer, Jakob Stämpfli, Gächinger Kantorei & Figuralchor der Gedächtniskirche Stuttgart, Bach-Collegium Stuttgart, conductor Helmuth Rilling, Cantate-Musicaphon 1967

Literature 
 Alfred Dürr: Johann Sebastian Bach: Die Kantaten. Bärenreiter, Kassel 1999 (in German)
 Markus Rathey: Bach's Major Vocal Works: Music-Drama-Liturgy. London: Yale University Press, 2016, 138–165
 Christoph Wolff, Ton Koopman: Die Welt der Bach-Kantaten. Verlag J. B. Metzler, Stuttgart, Weimar 2006 (in German)

Notes

References

External links 
 Cantata BWV 249a Entfliehet, verschwindet, entweichet, ihr Sorgen Bach Cantatas Website

Secular cantatas by Johann Sebastian Bach
1725 compositions
Lost musical works by Johann Sebastian Bach